The Dublin Rebels are the most successful team in the history of the Irish American Football League. They have earned nine national championship wins (Shamrock Bowl XV, XVII, XVIII, XIX, XX, XXIV, XXV, XXX, XXXI), four league titles, three European crowns, and have registered an undefeated season twice; once in 2006 and again in 2010.

Most recently, The Rebels posted an undefeated regular season, losing in the Shamrock Bowl, to UCD

History

1995 season
The Rebels were founded by Philip Woodyard, Marcus Naylor and Andrew Flynn in 1995. They eventually joined the 1995–1996 Irish Flag Football League season and the Rebels had an average season. The highlight of that season was the tie between the Devastators, which cost the Devastators a spot in the playoffs.
The Rebels were voted for the 'Best Newcomer Team' award.

1996 season
The following year, the Rebels entered a summer tournament and finished 3rd. That year seen the Rebels quarterback, unable to play, pulled out to oversee the team as manager. In the Flag Football League the Rebels secured their first playoff spot in the team history. They managed to reach the Final against the Pirates, but lost by a touchdown. Marcus Naylor picked up league MVP that year also.

1998 season
In 1998–99 the Rebels played their first full contact season in the league. The team was managed by Al Kelly. They finished mid-table.

2000 season
There was no league in 2000 due to lack of organisation in the management.

2001 season
2001 saw the league return again as the IAFL. There were 4 teams in the league out of a possible 6. The Rebels got to the Shamrock Bowl, beating the Carrickfergus Knights 28–7.

2002 season
In 2002 the Rebels won only one game in the season, beating the Dublin Dragons in the last game of the year. The Rebels played in the Charleroi Cup, beating the hosts 22-00 in the final.

2003 season
Hoping to rebuild from 2002, the Rebels lost a close season opener to the Knights. But continued a 9-game win streak, and once again reaching the Shamrock Bowl against the Knights once again, beating them 24–12.

2004 season
In the 2004 Season, the Rebels continued their tradition of introducing a number of rookies once again. The season saw the Rebels score 300 points and finish with a season record of 9–1 (inc playoff and final). They won the league title for the 1st time. They retained the Shamrock bowl by defeating their rivals the Knights 24–22 in the final. After trailing to them by 18pts at half time, they produced a comeback to deny them victory. The Rebels also broke the scoring record for a single game. Scoring 88 points against the Admirals.

The Dublin Rebels participated in the 2004 Charleroi American Football Trophy Tournament, held in Charleroi, Belgium on 25–26 June. The participating teams were the Dublin Rebels, Charleroi Cougars, Chevaliers d'Orleans, and the Lille Vikings. The Rebels lost to the Chevaliers d'Orleans team in the first round, 26–8. The Lille Vikings defeated the Charleroi Cougars 18–6. In the 3rd Place Playoff, the Rebels defeated the Charleroi Cougars 20–0. The Chevaliers d'Orleans won the Final against the Lille Vikings by a final score of 26–0.

2005 season
The 2005 season saw the Belfast Bulls trying to become the first unbeaten team in the league. The Rebels prevented this from happening beating them in the final game of the season. They met each other again in Shamrock Bowl XIX. The Rebels pulled off another last minute comeback against the Bulls to win. Quarterback Andy Dennehy was named as the game MVP.

2006 season
In 2006, the Rebels became the first unbeaten team in the IAFL going 10–0, winning all regular season games and winning the playoffs and the Shamrock Bowl 44–12 against the UL Vikings.  Linebacker Ross McCooey was named as the game MVP.

2007 season
In 2007, the Rebels failed to reach the Shamrock Bowl. They were beaten by the Cork Admirals in the Semi-final 8–6.

2008 season
The next year, the Rebels finished the 2008 season 7–1. The Rebels once again returned to the Shamrock Bowl to face the defending champions, the UL Vikings, but the Rebels lost 14–12.

Undergoing a period of transition from the old guard to a younger core of talent, the Rebels progressed sufficiently to reach Shamrock Bowl XXIII where they lost to the University of Limerick Vikings in sudden death overtime 9–6.

2009 season
Undergoing a period of transition from the old guard to a younger core of talent, the Rebels progressed sufficiently to reach Shamrock Bowl XXIII where they lost to the University of Limerick Vikings in sudden death overtime 9–6.

2010 season
Another year of experience for the new generation of Rebels provided a keen edge to the team, an edge which propelled the team to a perfect 8–0 regular season record.  With both their offence and defence statistically being the best in the league throughout the season the tempo was upped again in the semi-final versus the West Dublin Rhinos.  The Rebels rolled to a comfortable 65–0 victory, racking up ten touchdowns on the way.  This victory set up a meeting in Shamrock Bowl XXIV with the rival Vikings.

With the Vikings attempting to equal the Rebels record of four championships in a row, there was an added urgency about the challengers.  On the day it was the Rebels who shone through at Tallaght stadium as they went on to win 15–0 with Defensive Back Brian Carter being named as the game's MVP.

The 2010 Rebels finished the season giving up only 4.4 points per game, while amassing 41.9 points per game: both of which are team records.

2011 season
In 2011, the Rebels were once again Shamrock Bowl champions, defeating the Vikings once more, this time in Morton Stadium in Santry, North Dublin.

2016 season
In 2016, after going 7–1 in the Regular season with a home reverse versus defending champions Belfast Trojans being their only blemish, the Rebels went on to defeat the same opponent in Shamrock Bowl XXX in dramatic fashion.

With just 18 seconds on the clock, with over 20 yards to go, Quarterback Andy Dennehy found receiver Ciarán Fitzpatrick in traffic who crossed the line after breaking a tackle for the go ahead score generating rapturous scenes from the sidelines and in the stands. After a strong return from the Trojans, and with just 2.5 seconds on the clock, there was time enough for one more play. After short pass and number of laterals, the Trojans fumbled and a Rebel recovered possession and the cup was won.

2017 season
In 2017, after again going 7–1 in the Regular season with a home reverse versus University of Limerick Vikings being their only blemish, the Rebels went on to defeat the Carrickfergus Knights to win Shamrock Bowl XXXI with a final score of 12–6.

The Rebels would later go on to represent Ireland in the 2017 Atlantic Cup, as winners of the 2016 Shamrock Bowl. Facing off against 2016 Romanian Champions the Bucharest Rebels in Dublin in November 2017. The Dublin Rebels would come away with the trophy after a convincing 42–14 victory

2018 season
In 2018, after  going 6–2 in the Regular season with losses on the road versus the Cork Admirals and the Belfast Trojans being their only blemishes, the Rebels went on to defeat the Belfast Trojans in the Semi Finals to head to  Shamrock Bowl XXXII. The Rebels would fall in the final to the Admirals 18-16 in Tallaght Stadium, Dublin.

2019 season
In 2019, the Rebels failed to make the playoffs after a 2-6 season.

Championships 

Shamrock Bowl XV
Shamrock Bowl XVII
Shamrock Bowl XVIII
Shamrock Bowl XIX
Shamrock Bowl XX
Shamrock Bowl XXIV
Shamrock Bowl XXV
Shamrock Bowl XXX
Shamrock Bowl XXXI
Atlantic Cup 2017
Charleroi Cup 2002
Charleroi Cup 2003

References

External links 
 

American football teams in the Republic of Ireland
American football teams in County Dublin
1995 establishments in Ireland
American football teams established in 1995